The  was the first season of the Japan Football League, the third tier of the Japanese football league system.

Overview 

After the dissolution of former Japan Football League in order to form J. League Division 2, the new Japan Football League was established from this season as the nationwide top division for amateur clubs. It was originally planned to have 8 clubs, including seven former JFL clubs and Yokogawa Electric, promoted from Kantō Soccer League, one of nine Japanese Regional Leagues. But it eventually became nine-club structure by accepting Yokohama FC, which was established by supporters of defunct Yokohama Flügels, as an associate member as an extralegal measures. Nine clubs played 24 matches each, in triple round-robin format. Yokohama F.C. won the championship but under the conditions of their associate membership were not eligible to promotion and had to stay in JFL for the next year.

Table

Results 
Round 1

Round 2

Round 3

Top scorers

Attendances

Promotion and relegation 
No relegation has occurred because the league was expanding to 12 teams. At the end of the season, the winner and runner-up of the Regional League promotion series, ALO's Hokuriku and Tochigi SC were promoted automatically. In addition, FC Kyoken and Shizuoka Sangyo University were included by JFA and College FA recommendations.

1999
3